Isabella Shinikova (born 25 October 1991) is a Bulgarian tennis player.

On 20 February 2017, she reached a career-high singles ranking of world No. 133. On 20 May 2019, she peaked at No. 159 in the WTA doubles rankings. She also plays for the Bulgaria Fed Cup team, with a current win–loss record of 15–20.

Junior career
Shinikova started playing tennis at the age seven. She played on the ITF Junior Circuit in 2006 and won two singles titles and one doubles title.

Professional career

2009–15: Professional debut, success on the ITF Circuit
In 2009, Shinikova made her pro debut at a $25k event. Since then, she has been playing on the ITF Women's Circuit, and in 2015, she topped the annual leaderboard winning eight titles through the year.

2016–17: WTA Tour & major qualifications, top 150 debut
In April 2016, Shinikova made her main-draw debut at a WTA Tour tournament at the Katowice Open, losing to Alizé Cornet in the first round. Then, she failed to qualify for the main draws of Stuttgart Open, Rosmalen Open and Birmingham Classic. In July 2016, Shinikova qualified for the main draw at the Bucharest Open, losing to Simona Halep, in the second round. 

She made her major debut in 2016 in the qualifying draws of the Wimbledon and at the US Open, where seeded 31st, she lost to Laura Robson in the second round. In 2017, she made also her debut in the qualifying draw at the other two Grand Slam events. She reached a career-high ranking of No. 133 on 20 February 2017, following the Australian Open.

2019–22: Progress at Grand Slam tournaments
She reached second round at the 2019 Wimbledon Championships, the third round of qualifying at the 2019 US Open, her best showing at a major thus far, and the second round of qualifying at the 2020 Australian Open.

2023: United Cup debut
On 23 November 2022, she was confirmed as a participant at the 2023 United Cup as part of the Bulgarian team.

She won her doubles match, partnering Alexander Lazarov, and the tie against Belgium represented by former doubles No. 1, Elise Mertens, and her partner David Goffin.

Grand Slam performance timeline

Singles

ITF Circuit finals

Singles: 42 (22 titles, 20 runner–ups)

Doubles: 58 (31 titles, 27 runner–ups)

Year-end rankings

National participation

Fed Cup/Billie Jean King Cup
Shinikova debuted for the Bulgaria Fed Cup team in 2012. Since then, she has a 8–12 singles record and a 7–8 doubles record (15–20 overall).

Singles (8–12)

Doubles (7–8)

United Cup

Singles (0–2)

Doubles (1–0)

References

External links

 
 
 

1991 births
Living people
Bulgarian female tennis players
Sportspeople from Sofia
21st-century Bulgarian women